La Religieuse may refer to:


Books
 La Religieuse (novel), an 18th-century French novel by Denis Diderot

Film
 The Nun (1966 film), a 1966 film adaptation of the novel, directed by Jacques Rivette
 The Nun (2013 film), a 2013 film adaptation of the novel, directed by Guillaume Nicloux

Food
 Religieuse, a French pastry
 La religieuse, a French-language term for the thin crust of toasted cheese that forms at the bottom of a pot of cheese fondue

Music
 "La religieuse" (song), 1988 single by Celine Dion
 La Religieuse, 1875 choral work by Théodore Gouvy